Arthur Daniel Healey (December 29, 1889 – September 16, 1948) was a Democratic United States Representative from Massachusetts from 1933 to 1942 and a United States district judge of the United States District Court for the District of Massachusetts.

Education and career

Born in Somerville, Massachusetts, Healey attended public schools and graduated from Somerville Latin School in 1908. He attended Dartmouth College in 1909 and 1910. Healey received a Bachelor of Laws from Boston University School of Law in 1913, was admitted to the bar in 1914, and engaged in the private practice of law in Boston from 1914 to 1917. On August 9, 1917, he enlisted in the United States Army and rose through the ranks to second lieutenant in the Quartermaster Corps. He was discharged on March 6, 1919. He then returned to his law practice until 1933.

Congressional service

Healey was elected as a Democrat to an open seat for the Massachusetts's 8th congressional district beginning with the 73rd United States Congress, taking office on March 4, 1933. He was returned to the four succeeding Congresses. His name was attached to one significant piece of New Deal legislation, the 1936 Walsh–Healey Act, which regulated hours and working conditions for employees working on government contracts. In 1938, he became one of the initial members of the newly created House Un-American Activities Committee.

Federal judicial service

Healey served in Congress until he resigned to accept an appointment as a judge of the United States District Court for the District of Massachusetts. President Franklin D. Roosevelt nominated Healey on December 1, 1941, to the seat on that court which had been vacated by Judge Elisha Hume Brewster. Healey was confirmed by the United States Senate on December 16, 1941, and received his commission on December 19, 1941, but remained in Congress until  August 3, 1942. Healey thereafter served on the court until his death in Somerville on September 16, 1948. He is buried in Oak Grove Cemetery in Medford, Massachusetts. The Arthur D. Healey School in Somerville is a public elementary school named after him.

See also
 List of members of the House Un-American Activities Committee

References

Sources
 
 
 

1889 births
1948 deaths
Politicians from Somerville, Massachusetts
Military personnel from Massachusetts
Dartmouth College alumni
Boston University School of Law alumni
Judges of the United States District Court for the District of Massachusetts
United States district court judges appointed by Franklin D. Roosevelt
20th-century American judges
Quartermasters
United States Army officers
Democratic Party members of the United States House of Representatives from Massachusetts